Dr. Javad Parvizi is an American Board Certified Orthopaedic Surgeon and the director of clinical research at the Rothman Orthopaedic Institute, Philadelphia. He holds the James Edwards Professor Chair of Orthopaedics at Thomas Jefferson University. He is the co-founder of the International Consensus Meeting and President of the Musculoskeletal Infection Society (MSIS).

Early life and education
Parvizi was born in Zanjan, Azerbaijan, Iran in 1965.  He lived there until the age of 16.

Dr. Javad Parvizi trained in the United Kingdom, the United States and Switzerland. He earned his medical degree from the University of Sheffield, UK in 1991 and then underwent specialist surgical training in Newcastle, UK. In 1995, he moved to Rochester, US, to the Mayo Clinic as a research fellow and graduate student. In 1997 he obtained a Master of Science in Orthopaedics from the Mayo Foundation, Mayo Clinic, Rochester. He then started the residency in Orthopaedic Surgery  at the Mayo Clinic. After finishing the residency in 2002, he was awarded  the Hip Society-Muller Foundation Fellowship in Adult Reconstruction to spend additional surgical training at the Insalspital Hospital at the University of Berne, Switzerland. In Berne, he worked with Dr. Maurice Edmond Müller, and Professor Reinhold Ganz to learn joint preservation surgical management of the hip. After his training in Bern, he joined the Rothman Institute in 2003, where he has remained until this date.

Research and Career
The most important area of his research is infections following joint replacement and also conducted research on the bacterial free-floating biofilms that form in human joint infections. He also did research on the low-dose aspirin, finding it as effective as higher-dose aspirin for the prevention of venous thromboembolism and associated with fewer gastrointestinal side effects.

Dr. Javad Parvizi is a Joint Replacement Surgeon at the Rothman Orthopaedic Speciality Hospital and also serving at the Thomas Jefferson University Hospital as a Vice Chairman of Research. During his tenure at Jefferson Medical College, he served in different positions from Assistant Professor to Professor in the Department of Orthopaedic Surgery. He served as the President of the Eastern Orthopaedic Association in the year 2018.

Awards and honors
Dr. Javad Parvizi received the Chitranjan Ranawat Award from the Knee Society. Additional awards include the Mark Coventry Award, Insall Award, ASHP best practice award, Best researcher of the year award, and Otto Aufranc Award. He served as one of the board of directors at Maurice. E. Muller Foundation of North America and presented at the 2019 American Association of Hip and Knee Surgeons annual meeting.

Patents
Dr. Javad Parvizi has applied for several patents for his inventions. His patent applications include,
Materials and methods for diagnosis of peri-implant bone and joint infections using prophenoloxidase pathway, (2017). 
Methods utilizing D-dimer for diagnosis of periprosthetic joint infection, (2017).
Covalent modification of decellularized allogeneic grafts with active pharmaceuticals, (2017).

Books
 Orthopedic Examination Made Easy. Amazon Books. 2006. 
 Operative Techniques in Joint Reconstruction Surgery. 2016. 
 High Yield Orthopaedics. Elsevier. 2010. 
 Essentials in Total Hip Arthroplasty. Slack Incorporated. 2009. 
 Operative Techniques in Adult Reconstruction Surgery. Lippincott Williams and Wilkins. 2010.

Grants
Dr. Javad Parvizi's research on musculoskeletal infection was funded by the National Institute of Health (NIH) agency and the project started on 25 September 2013 and it ended on 31st  August 2014 and the total cost incurred for this project is $15,000.

Dr. Javad Parvizi's research on smart hip Implants with the modified biological surface was funded by the NIH agency The project started on 1 May 2005 and it ended on 30 March 2010, and the total cost incurred was $87,480.

Publications
 Javad Parvizi, and Kyung-Hoi Koo. "Should a Urinary Tract Infection Be Treated before a Total Joint Arthroplasty?". Journal of Hip and Pelvis.
 Javad Parvizi, Thorsten Gehrke, Michael A. Mont, and John J. Callaghan. "Introduction: Proceedings of International Consensus on Orthopedic Infections". The Journal of Arthroplasty.
 Javad Parvizi, Laurent Sedel, and Michael Dunbar. "Clinical Faceoff: Instability After THA The Potential Role of the Bearing Surface". Journal of Clinical Orthopaedics and Related Research.
 Javad Parvizi, Jessica R Benson, and Jeffrey M Muir. "A new mini-navigation tool allows accurate component placement during anterior total hip arthroplasty". Journal of Dovepress.
 Javad Parvizi, Timothy L.Tan, Karan Goswami, Carlos Higuera, Craig Della Valle, Antonia F.Chen, and Noam Shohat. "The 2018 Definition of Periprosthetic Hip and Knee Infection: An Evidence-Based and Validated Criteria". The Journal of Arthroplasty.

References

External links
 https://www.researchgate.net/profile/Javad_Parvizi2
 https://www.semanticscholar.org/author/Javad-Parvizi/31283531
 https://www.drjavadparvizi.com 

Living people
Alumni of the University of Sheffield
Thomas Jefferson University faculty
American orthopedic surgeons
1965 births
People from Zanjan, Iran
Iranian emigrants to the United States